The Pears Institute for the Study of Antisemitism was launched in 2010, as a centre for research, teaching, and public policy formation relating to antisemitism and racial intolerance.

The Institute is based at Birkbeck, University of London, and was established by the Pears Foundation. The director is David Feldman.

References

External links 
Pears Institute for the Study of Antisemitism

Birkbeck, University of London
Opposition to antisemitism in the United Kingdom
2010 establishments in England